is the 2nd major-label single by the Japanese female idol group Momoiro Clover, released in Japan on November 10, 2010.

The single's title track was used as the second ending theme of the anime Yosuga no Sora.

Track listing

Chart performance

References

External links 
 CD single details on the official site

2010 singles
Momoiro Clover Z songs
King Records (Japan) singles
Japanese-language songs
2010 songs